An icebox is a compact non-mechanical refrigerator which was a common kitchen appliance before the development of safe powered refrigeration devices.

Ice Box may also refer to:

Structures
Ice Box (arena), an arena in Lincoln, Nebraska
Ice house (building), a building used to store ice throughout the year before refrigeration

Music
"Ice Box" (song), a song by Omarion
 “Icebox”, a song by Kevin Gates from the 2019 album I'm Him

Other uses
Ice Box (horse), an American Thoroughbred racehorse
Ice Box (magazine), a literary magazine produced by the University of Alaska Fairbanks
Ice Box (Washington), a mountain in Washington state 
Icebox.com, an internet company
The Icebox, a character from the 1994 comedy Little Giants

See also
Refrigerator
Cooler, a mechanical refrigerator